The 1954 Colorado Buffaloes football team was an American football team that represented the University of Colorado as a member of the Big Seven Conference during the 1954 college football season. Led by seventh-year head coach Dallas Ward, the Buffaloes compiled an overall record of 7–2–1 with a mark of 3–2–1 in conference play, tying for third place in the Big 7.

Schedule

References

Colorado
Colorado Buffaloes football seasons
Colorado Buffaloes football